The Small Wild Goose Pagoda, sometimes Little Wild Goose Pagoda, is one of two significant pagodas in Xi'an, Shaanxi, China, the site of the old Han and Tang capital Chang'an. The other notable pagoda is the Giant Wild Goose Pagoda, originally built in 652 and restored in 704. This pagoda, along with the Giant Wild Goose Pagoda and other sites along the Silk Road, was inscribed in 2014 on the UNESCO World Heritage List as the Silk Roads: the Routes Network of Chang'an-Tianshan Corridor World Heritage Site.

History
The Small Wild Goose Pagoda was built between 707–709, during the Tang dynasty under Emperor Zhongzong of Tang (r 705–710). The pagoda stood 45 m (147 ft) until the 1556 Shaanxi earthquake. The earthquake shook the pagoda and damaged it so that it now stands at a height of 43 m (141 ft) with fifteen levels of tiers. The pagoda has a brick frame built around a hollow interior, and its square base and shape reflect the building style of other pagodas from the era.

During the Tang Dynasty, the Small Wild Goose Pagoda stood across a street from its mother temple, the Dajianfu Temple. Pilgrims brought sacred Buddhist writings to the temple and pagoda from India, as the temple was one of the main centers in Chang'an for translating Buddhist texts. The temple was older than the pagoda, since it was founded in 684, exactly 100 days after the death of Emperor Gaozong of Tang (r. 649–683). Emperor Zhongzong had donated his residence to the building of a new temple here, maintaining the temple for 200 monks in honor of his deceased father Gaozong. The temple was originally called the Daxianfusi or Great Monastery of Offered Blessings by Zhongzong, until it was renamed Dajianfusi by Empress Wu Zetian in 690.

See also
Chinese architecture
Giant Wild Goose Pagoda
 Great Tang Records on the Western Regions
List of Buddhist temples
Jianfu Temple

Notes

References

Heng Chye Kiang. (1999). Cities of Aristocrats and Bureaucrats: The Development of Medieval Chinese Cityscapes. Singapore: Singapore University Press. .

709
Buddhist temples in Shaanxi
Buddhist temples in Xi'an
Buildings and structures completed in the 8th century
Buildings and structures in Xi'an
Tourist attractions in Xi'an
Pagodas in China
Tang dynasty Buddhist temples
Major National Historical and Cultural Sites in Shaanxi
World Heritage Sites in China